The medial condyle is the medial (or inner) portion of the upper extremity of tibia.

It is the site of insertion for the semimembranosus muscle.

See also
 Lateral condyle of tibia
 Medial collateral ligament

Additional images

References

External links
 
 
 

Bones of the lower limb
Tibia